Line 4 of Tianjin Metro is a metro line in Tianjin. The south section (Dongnanjiao–Xinxingcun) started operation on 28 December 2021.

Opening timeline

Stations (northwest to southeast)
OSI: Out-of-station interchange

References

Tianjin Metro lines
Railway lines opened in 2021
2021 establishments in China